The Bay Roskill Vikings are a rugby league football club based in Mount Roskill and Blockhouse Bay, New Zealand, who compete in Auckland Rugby League's Sharman Cup competition. The club was established in 1979.

History
The club was formed in October 1979 when the Mt Roskill Red Devils and the Blockhouse Bay Cougars amalgamated. Mount Roskill itself was a 1947 amalgamation of the Eden Roskill, Wesley, Mt Roskill clubs.

Mt Roskill won the Norton Cup in 1972. In 2018 they won the Phelan Shield for winning the second division regular season with a 15–0 win–loss record. Former Warriors players Jerome Ropati and Ben Henry both playing for the team during this season.

Notable players

The following Bay Roskill Vikings players have made the New Zealand national rugby league team, nicknamed the Kiwis:
 Kevin Barry
 Monty Betham
 Bill Burgoyne
 Gary Freeman
 Ben Henry
 Steve Matai
 Dane O'Hara
 Henry Perenara
 Matt Utai
 Sione Lousi 
 Sam Lousi 
 Jerry Seuseu 
 Jerome Ropati

Coach Bob Bailey has also coached the Kiwis.

Bay Roskill Senior Team Records (2022)
The season record for the most senior men's team in the club.

References

External links
Official site

 
Rugby clubs established in 1979
1979 establishments in New Zealand
Sport in West Auckland, New Zealand